Phytoecia badenkoi is a species of beetle in the family Cerambycidae. It was described by Mikhail Leontievich Danilevsky in 1988.

References

Phytoecia
Beetles described in 1988